The United Incandescent Lamp and Electricity Company was a Hungarian business which produced a range of electrical goods such as electrical switches, voltmeters, ammeters, telephones, dynamos, and carbon fibre light bulbs. It was founded by Béla Egger and his brothers in 1886. With the support of the Hungarian Commercial Bank of Pest and the Wiener Bankverein, the original company was involved in a number of mergers it became the United Electricity Company.

References

Companies of Hungary
Electronics companies of Hungary
1886 establishments in Austria-Hungary